This is a list of members of the Western Australian Legislative Council from 22 May 1952 to 21 May 1954. The chamber had 30 seats made up of ten provinces each electing three members, on a system of rotation whereby one-third of the members would retire at each biennial election.

Notes
 On 13 April 1953, Suburban Province Liberal MLC James Dimmitt resigned to accept an appointment as Agent-General for Western Australia in London. Liberal candidate Arthur Griffith won the resulting by-election on 20 June 1953.

Sources
 
 
 

Members of Western Australian parliaments by term